AFC Energy PLC is a developer of alkaline fuel cells which use hydrogen for electricity production.  The company is based in Cranleigh, Surrey, United Kingdom.  It is listed on the London Stock Exchange.

History
The company was established in 2006 by the acquisition of certain intellectual property rights and assets from Eneco. In 2010, it commissioned a hydrogen fuel cell named Alpha System at the Chinchilla underground coal gasification facility, operated by Linc Energy.  Combining these technologies allows usage of hydrogen, produced by the underground coal gasification process, as a feedstock for the fuel cell.

In August 2011, the company commissioned hydrogen fuel cell named Beta System at its facility in the United Kingdom.  In October 2011, AFC Energy commissioned two Beta Systems at the AkzoNobel chlor-alkali plant in Bitterfeld, in Germany.

In June 2012, AFC Energy and Industrial Chemicals Limited announced a plan to install the largest fuel cell facility in the United Kingdom with an electrical output of 1 MW. This was subsequently abandoned in 2013 in favour of deploying a large system at an Air Products facility at Stade, Germany. In September 2012, the company opened an alkaline fuel cell electrode pilot production plant in Dunsfold, Surrey.

In March 2015, AFC committed to build a 50 MW fuel cell park in South Korea, as part of a joint venture with two local companies, Samyoung and Changsing Chemical. In April 2015, AFC Energy signed a memorandum of understanding with Dubai Carbon for a 300 MW fuel cell park in Dubai. However, no progress of these projects has been reported.

In August 2015, AFC Energy commenced operation of its first KORE fuel cell system in Stade, Germany. In January 2016, the system reached capacity of 200 kW.

In July 2018, the company agreed to install a 200–400 kW fuel cell unit at the Southern Oil's biorefinery at Gladstone, Australia.

In April 2019, AFC Energy confirmed details of a new high-power density alkaline fuel cell technology, ideal where space and weight are relevant production considerations. Adam Bond, CEO at AFC Energy, said it was "a fuel cell platform capable of delivering performance only previously seen in other membrane-based fuel cell technologies, and at lower operating temperatures." 

Through 2019 AFC Energy altered its focus towards EV charging and partnered with Rolec. Perceived advantages of the AFC Energy system are the ability to operate in remote off-grid areas, the ability to neutralise the constraints of grid capacity in any situation, and carbon-free power generation. During 2019 AFC also set about branding its products. Of particular interest are the solid electrolyte fuel cell scheduled for release in 2022, and the Alkamem membrane, a high density fuel cell with possible applications in electrolysis. Its market capitalisation was some 7- 10% of other UK-listed hydrogen companies such as ITM power and Ceres Power. In June 2020 AFC Energy entered into an agreement with Acciona, a large Spanish construction company with a multi-national presence, to demonstrate the AFC Energy fuel cell on site. In July 2020 AFC Energy announced a collaboration with Extreme E to use its hydrogen fuel cell technology to enable its race fleet to be charged using zero emission energy. The by-product of utilizing these hydrogen fuel cell power generators for charging, water, will be used elsewhere on-site.

References

External links
 

Fuel cell manufacturers
Companies based in Surrey
Engineering companies of the United Kingdom